The Act 7 Will 4 & 1 Vict c 85, sometimes called the Offences against the Person Act 1837, was an Act of the Parliament of the United Kingdom of Great Britain and Ireland. It amended the law relating to offences against the person. It was one of the Acts for the Mitigation of the Criminal Law (chapters 84 to 91) passed during the session 7 Will 4 & 1 Vict. The Legal Observer said that this Act materially lessened the severity of the punishment of offences against the person.

This Act was adopted in New South Wales by section 1 of the Act 2 Victoria No 10.

This Act was repealed as to New Zealand by section 2 of, and Schedule A to, the Indictable Offences Acts Repeal Act 1867 (31 Vict No 8), and by section 3 of, and the First Part of the Schedule to, the Repeals Act 1878 (42 Vict No 28).

It repealed a number of offences under the Act 9 Geo 4 c 31, sometimes called the Offences against the Person Act 1828, and under the corresponding Irish Act (10 Geo 4 c 34), and re-enacted those offences in different terms.

The Act has been wholly replaced by the Offences against the Person Act 1861.

The 7th Earl of Cardigan was tried in the House of Lords on an indictment for offences under this Act in 1841.

Section 4 
This section replaced section 12 of the Act 9 Geo 4 c 31 (1828) and abolished the death penalty for shooting, stabbing, cutting or wounding with intent.

Section 6
This section replaced section 13 of the Act 9 Geo 4 c 31 (1828) and abolished the death penalty for post-quickening abortions. Unlike the previous Act, this provision made no distinction between pre- and post- quickening abortions.

Section 11
This section was repealed by section 10 of the Criminal Procedure Act 1851 (14 & 15 Vict c 100).

See also
Offences Against the Person Act

References
John Frederick Archbold. "1 Victoria, c. 85". The Recent Criminal Statutes, (1 Victoria, cc. 84 to 91,) with Forms of Indictments, Notes and Index. Shaw & Sons. Fetter Lane, London. 1837. Pages 17 to 43.
Richard Matthews. "Offences against the Person". The Criminal Law as altered by various Statutes of Will. IV. and 1 Victoria. Alphabetically Arranged. Comprising the New Statutes, New Forms of Indictment, the Evidence necessary to support them, the Punishment in each Case, and an Index. Saunders and Benning. Fleet Street, London. 1837. Pages 101 to 130.
William Newland Welsby and Edward Beavan. Chitty's Collection of Statutes. Second Edition. S Sweet. London. Hodges and Smith. Dublin. 1851. Volume 2. Title "Criminal Law". Subtitle "Offences against the Person". Pages 256 to 259.
John Tidd Pratt. A Collection of the Public General Statutes passed in the last Session (7 Will. 4 & 1 Vic.) as far as relates to the Office of a Justice of the Peace and to parochial matters, in England and Wales, with Notes, References, and an Index. Shaw & Sons. Fetter Lane, London. 1837. Pages 125 to 128.
"Abstract of Public General Statutes" (1837) 18 The Law Magazine 487
"Personal Offences Act" (1841) 5 Legal Guide 262
A Collection of the Public General Statutes passed in the Seventh Year of the Reign of His Majesty King William the Fourth and the First Year of the Reign of Her Majesty Queen Victoria, 1837. Printed by George Eyre and Andrew Spottiswoode, printers to the Queen's most excellent majesty. London. 1837. Pages 495 to 497. Google Books:  .
William Newland Welsby. Archbold's Summary of the Law Relative to Pleading and Evidence in Criminal Cases. By John Jervis. Fifth American Edition. Banks, Gould & Co. New York. Gould, Banks & Gould. Albany. 1846. London Edition pages 253, 355, 436, 438, 440, 455, 680 and passim. Pages 519 to 525, 530 to 542 and passim. 
John Jervis. Archbold's Summary of the Law Relative to Pleading and Evidence in Criminal Cases. Fourth American Edition. Gould, Banks and Co. New York. W and A Gould and Co. Albany. 1840. Pages 19, 55a, 99, 239, 240, 246, 246a, 250, 296, 412 to 416, 421 to 430, 453 to 454a, 457, 639a to 641, 647, 651.
Thomas Chitty. Burn's Justice of the Peace and Parish Officer. Twenty-Ninth Edition. Sweet. Maxwell and Son. Stevens and Norton. London. 1845. Volume 1. Pages 7, 11, 13, 14, 18, 32, 285, 299, 495, 497, 608. See other volumes.
Benjamin Boothby. A Synopsis of the Law relating to Indictable Offences. Saunders and Benning. Fleet Street, London. 1842. Pages 2, 8, 9, 12, 15, 17, 51, 268, 271, 324, 326, 328, 330, 334, 336, 338, 339, 381, 383, 385, 407, 411, 423, 437.
R Tarrant Harrison. Harrison's Analytical Digest of all the Reported Cases determined in The house of Lords, The several Courts of Common Law, in Banc and Nisi Prius, and The Court of Bankruptcy; from Michaelmas Term, 1856, to Easter Term 1843: including also the Crown Cases Reserved, and a full selection of Equity Decisions: with the Manuscript Cases cited in the best modern Treaties not elsewhere reported: to which is added a Supplement continuing the Work to the Year 1846. Second American Edition, from the Third London Edition. Robert H Small. Philadelphia. 1846. Columns 1902, 1904, 1949 to 1958, 1960, 1961, 1976, 1977, 2179, 2180.

English criminal law
Offences against the person
United Kingdom abortion law
United Kingdom Acts of Parliament 1837
1837 in British law
Repealed United Kingdom Acts of Parliament